The Brusio spiral viaduct (or Brusio circular viaduct;) is a single-track nine-arched stone spiral railway viaduct on the Bernina Railway. It was opened on 1 July 1908.

A key structure of the World Heritage Site-listed Bernina Railway, it is located near Brusio, in the Canton of Graubünden, Switzerland, and was built to limit the railway's gradient at that location within its specified maximum of 7%. It is considered to be one of the architectural highlights of the Rhaetian Railway.

Location
The Brusio spiral viaduct forms part of the Bernina Railway section between Brusio and Campascio railway stations.

History

During the construction of the Bernina Railway, its engineers decided that its route and features ought to follow and adapt to the natural landscape to the maximum extent, avoiding unnecessary complexity wherever possible. They also decided to avoid the construction of a rack-and-pinion railway due to a desire for the line to be suitable for both passenger and freight traffic; the adoption of a rack system would have made it impossible to run heavy trains, effectively preventing the line's use by freight trains. It was also desirable for the line to serve valley locations, and thus for the route to vary in height above the valley floor. It was such decisions that drove the construction of the Brusio spiral viaduct.

A spiral viaduct was required immediately south of Brusio to limit the railway's grade to the required maximum of 7%, so that the train would not slip on the way up, or be uncontrollable on the way down. The construction of a viaduct on this site had not been originally planned for; instead, a spiral tunnel was at one point intended to be constructed; however, local geological factors discouraged the boring of such a tunnel. Therefore, the line's engineers decided to construct a 360 degree curve with a  radius, rising up from the valley floor, the viaduct forms a part of that curve.

The spiral configuration maximises the rate of elevation in comparison to a conventional curve, while also avoiding the inconveniences of a switchback alternative. Wherever reasonable, local materials were sourced for its construction.

On 1 July 1908, the viaduct was opened in conjunction with the opening of the Tirano–Poschiavo section of the Bernina Railway. In 1943, the whole of the Bernina Railway was taken over by the Rhaetian Railway; this company continues to both own and operate services across the spiral viaduct to the present day. The services the spiral viaduct carries facilitate not only local trade purposes but tourism as well. Since 2008, the spiral viaduct, along with the rest of the route, has been recognised as a UNESCO World Heritage Site.

See also
 Arch bridge
 Spiral (railway) 
 Bernina Express
 Rhaetian Railway

References

Citations

Bibliography

 Belloncle, Patrick. Le chemin de fer Rhétique, 1889-1999. Les Editions du Cabri, Switzerland, .
 Carter, Graeme., Colin Garratt, David Jackson, Howard Johnston, William D. Middleton and Karl Zimmermann. Trains: The World's Greatest Trains, Tracks and Travels. Fog City Press, 2003. .
 
 Shales, Melissa. On the Rails Around the Alps. Passport Books, 1996. .
 Widmer, Markus. Eisenbahnbrücken. Transpress, Stuttgart (Germany), .
 Wolmar, Christian. A Short History of Trains. Dorling Kindersley Ltd, 2019.

External links

 
 
 Webcam overlooking Brusio spiral viaduct 
 Video (9:56 min, 2020) of several trains traversing the Brusio spiral viaduct

Viaducts in Switzerland
Rhaetian Railway bridges
Monuments and memorials in Switzerland
World Heritage Sites in Switzerland
Buildings and structures in Graubünden
Bridges completed in 1908
1908 establishments in Switzerland
20th-century architecture in Switzerland